Hickory Creek may refer to several places in the United States:

Canada
 Hickory Creek, a watershed administered by the Long Point Region Conservation Authority, that drains into Lake Erie

Arkansas
 Hickory Creek (Buffalo Creek tributary), at tributary of the Buffalo Creek in Polk County
 Hickory Creek (Illinois River tributary), at tributary of the Illinois River in Washington County
 Hickory Creek (White River, Benton County, Arkansas), a tributary of the White River in Benton County
 Hickory Creek (White River, Madison County, Arkansas), a tributary of the White River in Madison County
 Hickory Creek (Little Missouri River tributary), a tributary of the Little Missouri River in Hempstead and Pike Counties

Florida
Hickory Creek (Peace River tributary), a tributary of the Peace River in Hardee County

Louisiana
 Hickory Creek (Dobson Bayou tributary), a tributary of the Dobson Bayou in St. Tammany Parish

Michigan
 Hickory Creek (St. Joseph River tributary)

Missouri
 Hickory Creek, Audrain County, Missouri, an extinct town in Audrain County
 Hickory Creek, Grundy County, Missouri, an unincorporated community
 Hickory Creek (Black River tributary), a stream in Missouri
 Hickory Creek (Establishment Creek tributary), a stream in Missouri
 Hickory Creek (Grand River tributary), a stream in Missouri
 Hickory Creek (Little Wyaconda River tributary), a stream in Missouri
 Hickory Creek (Nodaway River tributary), a stream in Missouri
 Hickory Creek (Shoal Creek tributary), a stream in Missouri
 Hickory Creek (Thompson River tributary), a stream in Missouri

North Carolina
 Hickory Creek (Deep River tributary), a stream in Guilford County, North Carolina

Ohio
 Hickory Creek (Hickory Run tributary), a tributary of the Hickory Run in Mahoning County

Pennsylvania
 Hickory Creek (Delaware River tributary), a tributary of the Delaware River in Plumstead Township, Bucks County
 Hickory Creek (Hickory Run tributary), a tributary of Hickory Run in Mahoning County, Ohio, and Lawrence County
 Hickory Creek Wilderness

Texas
 Hickory Creek, Texas, a town in Denton County

See also
 Hickory Branch, Cooper County, Missouri, a stream
 Hickory Creek station, Mokena, Illinois